Jefthon Ferreira de Sena (born 3 January 1982), known as just Jefthon, is a Brazilian former football defender.

Career
A left-back, Jefthon has previously played for SFC Opava, Posušje, Kuban Krasnodar, Amur Blagoveschensk, Spartak Nalchik. He signed for the Croatian club Zagreb in September 2009 and played in the 2009–10 and 2010–11 seasons in the Prva HNL. In summer 2011 he moved to Široki Brijeg playing in the Bosnian Premier League, where he played for a season before returning to Brazil. Back in his home country he played for Alagoinhas Atlético Clube before moving on to Itabuna.

References

External links
 

1982 births
Living people
Brazilian footballers
Association football defenders
Brazilian expatriate footballers
Paraná Clube players
FC Kuban Krasnodar players
FC Rubin Kazan players
PFC Spartak Nalchik players
HŠK Posušje players
NK Široki Brijeg players
Expatriate footballers in Bosnia and Herzegovina
Expatriate footballers in Russia
Expatriate footballers in Slovenia
NK Zagreb players
SFC Opava players
FC Koper players
Russian Premier League players
Croatian Football League players
Slovenian PrvaLiga players
Alagoinhas Atlético Clube players
NK Inter Zaprešić players
Brazilian expatriate sportspeople in Russia
Brazilian expatriate sportspeople in Croatia
Brazilian expatriate sportspeople in Slovenia